Percy Robert Diggle was an English sportsman who played rugby union at an international level, touring Argentina with the 1910 Combined British rugby union side, an early incarnation of the British and Irish Lions.

Early life
Percy Robert Diggle was born on 27 November 1887, the son of the Venerable Archdeacon, the Right Reverend John William Diggle, who would later become the Bishop of Carlisle and his second wife Edith Moss, (the daughter of Gilbert Winter Moss and Eliza Seilliere Zwilchenbart whom he married on 23 April 1884). He attended Marlborough College where he featured as captain of the School's second fifteen rugby squad, though he did not play in the first fifteen. He went on to Oxford University where he received his blue for rugby.

Rugby union
Diggle played rugby at school, though did not feature in the first choice fifteen. However, he did represent Oxford University. He went on to represent his home county of Cumberland and although he was never selected to play rugby for England, he was selected to tour with the Combined British on the 1910 tour to Argentina where he played in what Argentina count as their first test match.

Career and later life
In 1911 Diggle was listed as a member of the Inner Temple and by 1938 listed his occupation as the director of a company. In 1923 he married Edwina Margery Stead who was 13 years his junior. The couple lived in Penrith. He died in 1977, his death being registered in Kendal.

References

1887 births
1977 deaths
English rugby union players
Rugby union forwards
British & Irish Lions rugby union players from England
Alumni of the University of Oxford
Oxford University RFC players
Rugby union players from London